I Was a Simple Man is an American family drama film written and directed by Christopher Makoto Yogi. The film stars Steve Iwamoto, Constance Wu, Tim Chiou and Kanoa Goo.

The film has its world premiere at the 2021 Sundance Film Festival on January 29, 2021 and received a limited theatrical release in the United States on November 19, 2021 by Strand Releasing.

Plot

Cast
The cast includes:
 Steve Iwamoto as Masao Matsuyoshi
 Constance Wu as Grace
 Tim Chiou as Adult Masao
 Kanoa Goo as Gavin
 Chanel Akiko Hirai as Kati
 Nelson Lee as Mark
 Hau'oli Carr as Ashley
 Kyle Kosaki as Young Masao
 Boonyanudh Jiyarom as Young Grace

Reception  
The film won the Grand Jury Award at the San Diego Asian Film Festival. It also won the Grand Jury Prize at the Los Angeles Asian Pacific Film Festival and the Made in Hawai‘i Award at the Hawai‘i International Film Festival.

  It was named the fourth best film of 2021 in the New Yorker Magazine, where film critic Richard Brody called it "one of the great films about death." Roxana Hadadi wrote on RogerEbert.com that the film is a "100-minute spell of beauty and melancholy, intimate and grand in equal measure", while David Ehrlich of IndieWire called it "masterful" and dubbed it a "Critics Pick".

References

External links
 
 

2021 drama films
2021 independent films
American drama films
American independent films
2020s American films